The Kenya national rugby league team represent Kenya in the sport of rugby league football. The goal was to qualify into 2025 Rugby League World Cup for the first time.

History
They made their international rugby league debut against Italy where Kenya defeated them 34-24 in front of over 5000 fans at a local primary school in Watamu. The team was hastily formed from selection of local rugby union players. They were introduced to the rules and regulations in rugby league for merely one week before the match.

2014 Squad

See also

Rugby league in Kenya
Kenya Rugby League Association
Rugby league in Africa

References

External links

National rugby league teams
National sports teams of Kenya
Rugby league in Kenya